Minx, MinX or MINX may refer to:

Music
 MINX (band), dissolved South Korean girl group replaced by Dreamcatcher
 MINX (musician) (born 1983), Australian DJ and producer
 Minx (Leatherface album), 1993
 Minx (Toyah album), 1985

Print
 Minx (comics), a DC Comics imprint
 Minx (magazine), a UK magazine

Other uses
 MinX (television), the British TV channel from Chart Show Channels
 Minnie the Minx, a comic strip and character
 The Minx, a 2007 film
 Hillman Minx, a car
 Tiffany Mynx (born 1971)
 Minx (TV series), an American comedy streaming television series

See also 
 Mynx vascular closure device
 Slinkee Minx, an Australian dance act
 MINIX, a micro-kernel operating system
 Mink